The McDonald Farm is a historic agricultural complex near the city of Xenia in Greene County, Ohio, United States.  It has been named a historic site, largely because of a quarry on the farm, which supplied stone for the Washington Monument.

Geology
Much of Greene County is underlain by Dayton Limestone, a high-quality limestone whose type locality is in the city of Dayton in the adjacent Montgomery County. Farmers in Greene County supplied building stone for local needs through much of the nineteenth century, and by the late 1870s it was being exported to distant localities by the Dayton and Xenia Railroad. The reputation of McDonald's quarry became more prominent than any other source of Greene County limestone; before concrete became prominent as a building material, McDonald supplied substantial amounts of limestone for Xenia buildings, and some of his stone was transported to farther localities. Eventually, McDonald became known as the supplier of one of Ohio's best limestones. Quarrying continued until 1896, when the stream by the quarry flooded it, although a small amount of stone was quarried in the 1930s. Today, the quarry remains filled with water.

Historic significance
In 1849, each of the United States was asked to supply a block of stone for the construction of the Washington Monument.

In 1996, the McDonald Farm was listed on the National Register of Historic Places, by Margretta Lott Bodewell-Great-Great-Granddaughter of the original owner of the property, qualifying both because of the farm buildings' architecture and because of the farm's place in local history. The architecture of the farm buildings is mixed among multiple architectural styles, including a vernacular I-house and the formal Federal and Greek Revival styles.

References

Buildings and structures in Greene County, Ohio
Farms on the National Register of Historic Places in Ohio
Federal architecture in Ohio
Greek Revival houses in Ohio
Limestone industry
National Register of Historic Places in Greene County, Ohio
Quarries in the United States
Historic districts on the National Register of Historic Places in Ohio
Xenia, Ohio
1829 establishments in Ohio